Michael W(h)arton may refer to:

 Michael Wharton (1913–2006), British newspaper columnist
 Michael Wharton (died 1590), MP for Beverley
 Michael Warton (died 1688) (1623–1688), English politician
 Michael Warton (died 1645) (1593–1645), English politician
 Michael Warton (died 1725), English politician, Member of Parliament for Beverley